Marsman is a Dutch surname. It is either an occupational surname, with the meaning "peddler, hawker" (similar to the surname Kramer), or a toponymic surname, with more or less the meaning "marsh man". People with the surname include:

 Gooitske Marsman (born 1965), Dutch judoka
 Hendrik Marsman (1899–1940), Dutch poet and writer 
 Hendrik Jan Marsman (1937–2012), Dutch writer, poet, novelist and translator known by his pen name J. Bernlef
 Margot Marsman (born 1932), Dutch swimmer
 Nick Marsman (born 1990), Dutch football goalkeeper

References 

Dutch-language surnames
Occupational surnames
Toponymic surnames